Thomas Constable (21 July 1737, Beverley16 February 1786, Sigglesthorne) was Archdeacon of the East Riding from 11 December 1784 until his death.

He was educated at St John's College, Cambridge;  and ordained in 1673. He held livings at Stonegrave and Hindolveston.

References

18th-century English Anglican priests
Alumni of St John's College, Cambridge
Archdeacons of the East Riding
1737 births
1786 deaths
People from Beverley